A. Newton Farm is a historic home and farm complex located at Orleans in Jefferson County, New York. The farmhouse was built about 1870 and is a small, modest -story Greek Revival building with a gable front, prominent cornice returns, a northside wing, and a modern kitchen ell on the rear. Also on the property are a hay barn, blacksmith's shop, toolshed, pig barn, milk and ice house, hay and heifer barn, and horse barn.

It was listed on the National Register of Historic Places in 1997.

References

Houses on the National Register of Historic Places in New York (state)
Greek Revival houses in New York (state)
Houses completed in 1870
Houses in Jefferson County, New York
National Register of Historic Places in Jefferson County, New York
Blacksmith shops